|}

The Haynes, Hanson and Clark Conditions Stakes is a flat horse race in Great Britain open to two-year-old colts and geldings. It is run at Newbury over a distance of 1 mile (1,609 metres), and it is scheduled to take place each year in September.

The event was known as the Kris Plate in 1979 and 1980, and on these two occasions it was won by the subsequent Derby winners Henbit and Shergar.

The race was given its present title in 1981, when the wine merchants Haynes, Hanson and Clark became its sponsor. Since then it has been contested by two future Derby winners, Shahrastani, the runner-up in 1985, and Authorized, third in 2006.

Records
Leading jockey since 1979 (3 wins):
 Pat Eddery – Rainbow Quest (1983), Zinaad (1991), Boatman (1998)
 Kevin Darley – Fight Your Corner (2001), Winged Cupid (2005), Teslin (2006)

Leading trainer since 1979 (5 wins):
 Marcus Tregoning – Ethmaar (1999), Nayef (2000), Elshadi (2003), Taameer (2008), Cavaleiro (2011)

Winners since 1979

See also
 Horse racing in Great Britain
 List of British flat horse races

References
 Paris-Turf: 
 Racing Post:

Flat races in Great Britain
Newbury Racecourse
Flat horse races for two-year-olds